Jean-Baptiste Mills (1 July 1749 – 7 December 1806) was a politician from Saint-Domingue who served in the French Parliament from 1793 to 1795. He was born in Cap-Haïtien and died in Bastia, Corsica (he was deported in Corsica by Napoleon Bonaparte)

See also
:fr:Déportés guadeloupéens et haïtiens en Corse
Jean-Louis Annecy

References

External links 
 French National Assembly website

1749 births
1806 deaths
People from Cap-Haïtien
People of Saint-Domingue
Haitian politicians
Haitian people of French descent
Deputies to the French National Convention
French abolitionists